The following is the list of World Judo Championships medalists in the sport of judo.

Men

Extra Lightweight
60 kg

Half Lightweight
65 kg (1979–1997)
66 kg (1999–)

Lightweight
68 kg (1965)
63 kg (1967–1975)
71 kg (1979–1997)
73 kg (1999–)

Half Middleweight
70 kg (1967–1975)
78 kg (1979–1997)
81 kg (1999–)

Middleweight
80 kg (1965–1975)
86 kg (1979–1997)
90 kg (1999–)

Half Heavyweight
93 kg (1967–1975)
95 kg (1979–1997)
100 kg (1999–)

Heavyweight
80+ kg (1965)
93+ kg (1967–1975)
95+ kg (1979–1997)
100+ kg (1999–)

Openweight

Team

Women

Extra Lightweight
48 kg

Half Lightweight
52 kg

Lightweight
56 kg (1980–1997)
57 kg (1999–)

Half Middleweight
61 kg (1980–1997)
63 kg (1999–)

Middleweight
66 kg (1980–1997)
70 kg (1999–)

Half Heavyweight
72 kg (1980–1997)
78 kg (1999–)

Heavyweight
72+ kg (1980–1997)
78+ kg (1999–)

Openweight

Team

Unlike 2013, Kelmendi did not compete under the Kosovo flag but under the International Judo Federation flag.

Mixed

Team

Video footage
World Championship 2013 in Rio de Janeiro
World Championships 2012 in Salvador
World Championships 2011 in Paris
World Championships 2010 in Tokyo
World Championships 2009 in Rotterdam
World Championships 2007 in Rio de Janeiro
World Championships 2005 in Cairo
World Championships 2003 in Osaka
World Championships 2001 in Munich
World Championships 1999 in Birmingham
World Championships 1997 in Paris
World Championships 1995 in Chiba
World Championships 1993 in Hamilton
World Championships 1991 in Barcelona
World Championships 1989 in Belgrade
World Championships 1987 in Essen
World Championships 1985 in Seoul
World Championships 1983 in Moscow
World Championships 1981 in Maastricht
World Championships 1980 in New York
World Championships 1979 in Paris
World Championships 1961 in Paris
World Championships 1956 in Tokyo

See also
 List of Olympic medalists in judo
 List of European Judo Championships medalists

External links
Judo Union
European Judo Union
http://www.judoinside.com/judoka/statsgen
http://www.judobase.org/

Medalists
Lists of judoka
Medalists in judo
Judo